Eucalyptus michaeliana, commonly known as Hillgrove gum or brittle gum, is a species of small to medium-sized tree that is endemic to eastern Australia. It has smooth mottled greyish bark, lance-shaped to curved adult leaves, flower buds in compound umbels, white flowers and cup-shaped or barrel-shaped fruit.

Description
It has smooth, mottled, grey and white or cream-coloured bark that is shed in plates or flakes. The flower buds are arranged in leaf axils on a peduncle with three to five groups of buds, each with three or seven buds. Flowering occurs in March and the flowers are white.

Taxonomy and naming
Eucalyptus michaeliana was first formally described in 1938 by William Blakely from specimens collected by John Fauna Campbell near Hillgrove in 1907. The description was published in Proceedings of the Linnean Society of New South Wales. The specific epithet honours Norman Michael (1884–1951), a clergyman who collected plant specimens in Queensland, including this species that he collected in 1937 whilst he was a minister at Boonah.

Distribution and habitat
Hillgrove gum grows in woodland on sandy soils and has a disjunct distribution between St Albans and Wollomombi in New South Wales and in south-east Queensland.

References

Flora of New South Wales
Flora of Queensland
michaeliana
Myrtales of Australia
Trees of Australia
Plants described in 1938
Taxa named by William Blakely